Tamara Ivanovna Frolova (born 2 November 1959) is a Russian politician from United Russia.

Education 
Graduated from Volgograd State Medical University.

Political career 
She was elected to the State Duma in 2016. She was re-elected in 2021. She was named in the Panama Papers.

She is one of the members of the State Duma the United States Treasury sanctioned on 24 March 2022 in response to the 2022 Russian invasion of Ukraine.

References 

1959 births
Living people
People from Tambov Oblast
United Russia politicians
Seventh convocation members of the State Duma (Russian Federation)
Eighth convocation members of the State Duma (Russian Federation)
20th-century Russian physicians
21st-century Russian women politicians
People named in the Panama Papers
Russian individuals subject to the U.S. Department of the Treasury sanctions